The 1972 Des Moines International was a men's tennis tournament played on indoor carpet courts at the Veterans Memorial Auditorium in Des Moines, Iowa in the United States that was part of the 1972 USLTA Indoor Circuit. It was the second edition of the event and was held from February 4 through February 6, 1972. Second-seeded Pancho Gonzales won the singles title and earned $3,000 first-prize money.

Finals

Singles
 Pancho Gonzales defeated  Georges Goven 3–6, 4–6, 6–3, 6–4, 6–2

Doubles
 Jim Osborne /  Jim McManus defeated  Georges Goven /  Thomaz Koch 6–2, 6–3

References

Des Moines International
Des Moines International
Des Moines International